Engenim d'Urre de Valentinès was a troubadour, possibly from Eurre. He wrote an undatable sirventes attacking "evil barons" that begins Pois pres s'en fui qe non troba guirensa. Internal evidence may suggest he was a valvassor. The song is found in the sixteenth-century Italian paper manuscript known as chansonnier a. His name is written Engenim Durre in the manuscript, and another possible correction of this is En Genim, meaning "Sir Genim".

Literature
Björkman, Sven (2002). "Pois pres s'en fui qe non troba guirensa: Un sirventès du troubadour Engenim d'Urre de Valentinès", pp. 35–41. Mélanges publiés en hommage à Gunnel Engwall, ed. Inge Bartning. Acta Universitatis Stockholmiensis.
Jeanroy, Alfred (1934). La poésie lyrique des troubadours. Toulouse: Privat.

French troubadours
People from Drôme